Gare d'Argentan is a railway station serving the town Argentan, Orne department, northwestern France.

Services

References

External links

 

Railway stations in Orne
Railway stations in France opened in 1866